The Marten River is a river in Nipissing District, Ontario, Canada. Situated in the Municipality of Temagami, it begins at the southern end of 

See also
List of rivers of Ontario

References

External links

Rivers of Temagami